There have been 18 referendums in New South Wales, 8 of which concerned proposals to amend the New South Wales Constitution, half of which concerned the Legislative Council. While the Constitution of Australia was adopted after the 1898 and 1899 referendums in all of the proposed states, the constitution of New South Wales, promulgated in 1902, was an Act of the Parliament of New South Wales which could be amended by parliament. Since 1927 the constitution has included provisions that can only be amended following approval in a referendum. 8 of the referendums, including 5 on the sale of alcohol, did not involve any proposed amendment to the constitution. While these have traditionally been called referendums, they could also be described as plebiscites.

Alteration of the Constitution

List of referendums

See also 
Referendums in Australia
Government of New South Wales
Elections in New South Wales

Notes

References 

New South Wales law